Edward Everett Horton Jr. (March 18, 1886 – September 29, 1970) was an American character actor. He had a long career in film, theater, radio, television, and voice work for animated cartoons.

Early life
Horton was born in Kings County, New York (now Brooklyn, New York City) to Edward Everett Horton, a compositor for The New York Times, and his wife, Isabella S. ( Diack) Horton. His father had English and German ancestry, and his mother was born in Matanzas, Cuba to George and Mary ( Orr) Diack, natives of Scotland. He attended Boys' High School, Brooklyn and Baltimore City College, where he later was inducted into its Hall of Fame.

He was a student at Oberlin College in Ohio, where he majored in German. However, he was asked to leave after he climbed to the top of a building and, after a crowd gathered, threw off a dummy, making them think he had jumped. He attended the Polytechnic Institute in Brooklyn for one year, until the school discontinued its arts courses; he moved on to Columbia University, "until I got fouled up with The Varsity Show of 1909. This was the first time I had really ever been on the stage... After that, to put it gently, Columbia and I came to an amicable parting of the ways. They were just as glad to see me go as I was to get out." That concluded Horton's collegiate period.

Stage and film career

Horton had begun his stage career in 1906, singing and dancing and playing small parts in college, vaudeville, and Broadway productions. His father persuaded him to adopt his full name professionally. "Originally, I went under the name of Edward Horton. My father said, 'I think you're making a mistake, Edward. Anybody could be Edward Horton, but nobody else could be Edward Everett Horton.' I said, 'I think I like that.'"

In 1919, he moved to Los Angeles, California, where he began acting in Hollywood films. His first starring role was in the comedy Too Much Business (1922), and he portrayed the lead role of an idealistic young classical composer in the comedy Beggar on Horseback (1925). In 1927–29, he starred in eight two-reel silent comedies produced by Harold Lloyd for Paramount Pictures release. He made the transition to sound films with Educational Pictures in 1929, in a series of sound-comedy playlets. As a stage-trained performer, he found more film work easily and appeared in some of Warner Bros.' movies, including The Terror (1928) and Sonny Boy (1929).

Horton soon cultivated his own special variation of the double take (an actor's reaction to something, followed by a delayed, more extreme reaction). In Horton's version, he smiled ingratiatingly and nodded in agreement with what just happened; then, when realization set in, his facial features collapsed entirely into a sober, troubled mask.

Horton starred in many comedy features in the 1930s, usually playing a mousy fellow who put up with domestic or professional problems to a certain point and then finally asserted himself for a happy ending. He is best remembered, however, for his work in supporting roles. These include The Front Page (1931), Trouble in Paradise (1932), Alice in Wonderland (1933), The Gay Divorcee (1934, the first of several Astaire/Rogers films in which Horton appeared), Top Hat (1935), Biography of a Bachelor Girl (1935), Danger - Love at Work (1937), Lost Horizon (1937), Holiday (1938), Here Comes Mr. Jordan (1941), Arsenic and Old Lace (1944), Pocketful of Miracles (1961), It's a Mad, Mad, Mad, Mad World (1963), and Sex and the Single Girl (1964). His last role was in the comedy film Cold Turkey (1971), in which his character communicated only through facial expressions.

Horton continued to appear in stage productions, often in summer stock. His performance in the play Springtime for Henry became a perennial in summer theaters.

Horton was so prolific he sometimes found himself committed to two projects at the same time. One project would be in progress while the second project suddenly came up sooner than expected, forcing Horton to make other arrangements. In 1953, Horton announced on the ABC-TV game show The Name's the Same that his next picture would be one of the Ma and Pa Kettle comedies. A scheduling conflict compelled Horton to bow out, and his role in Ma and Pa Kettle at Home was played by Alan Mowbray. 

In 1960, Horton was approached by his former director Frank Capra to work in the new film Pocketful of Miracles. Horton wanted to rejoin Capra, but had a commitment to finish a stage run of the play Once Upon a Mattress; the show wouldn't be closing for another two weeks. Horton phoned Buster Keaton, who had played the same role in an earlier production, and asked if Keaton could replace him. Keaton finished the play's run, and Horton made the Capra film.

Radio and television
From 1945 to 1947, Horton hosted radio's Kraft Music Hall. An early television appearance came in the play Sham, shown on The Chevrolet Tele-Theatre on December 13, 1948. During the 1950s, Horton worked primarily in television. One of his best-remembered appearances is in an episode of I Love Lucy, broadcast in 1952, in which he is cast against type as a frisky, amorous suitor. In 1960, he guest-starred on The Real McCoys as J. Luther Medwick, grandfather of the boyfriend of series character Hassie McCoy (Lydia Reed). In the story, Medwick clashes with the equally outspoken Grandpa Amos McCoy (played by Walter Brennan).

He remains, however, best known to the Baby Boomer generation as the venerable narrator of Fractured Fairy Tales on The Rocky and Bullwinkle Show (1959–61), an American animated television series that originally aired from November 19, 1959, to June 27, 1964.

In 1962, he portrayed the character Uncle Ned in three episodes of Dennis the Menace. In 1965, he guest-starred in an episode of The Cara Williams Show and also played the medicine man, Roaring Chicken, in F Troop. He echoed this role, portraying Chief Screaming Chicken, on Batman as a pawn to Vincent Price's Egghead.

Personal life
Edward Everett Horton never discussed his private life publicly, but in 1968 he granted an interview to writers Bernard Rosenberg and Harry Silverstein in which he reviewed his life and career, punctuated by self-effacing remarks ("Nobody's older than I am. Oh, a few people are, but they are not in circulation"). Published in 1970, the interview only skims through his personal relationships. Horton recalled that, rather than dating or nightclubbing, he would invite his female co-stars to attend parties he was throwing. "I never married. However, I have not given up hope. This is Leap Year [1968], you know."

Death and legacy
Horton died of cancer in 1970 at age 84 in Encino, California. His remains were interred in Glendale's Whispering Pines section of Forest Lawn Memorial Park Cemetery.  

In 1925, Horton purchased several acres in the district of Encino, Los Angeles and lived on the property at 5521 Amestoy Avenue until his death. He named the estate Belleigh Acres, and it contained Horton's own house and houses for his brother, his sister and their respective families. In 1939, the author F. Scott Fitzgerald rented a house on the estate - he was working on his unfinished novel The Last Tycoon in his final years. In the 1950s, the state of California forced Horton to sell a portion of his property for construction of the Ventura Freeway. The freeway construction left a short stump of Amestoy Avenue south of Burbank Boulevard, and shortly after his death the city of Los Angeles renamed that portion Edward Everett Horton Lane.

Edward Everett Horton Lane begins in the shadow of the Ventura Freeway and ends at Burbank Boulevard. On the other side of the boulevard is a bus stop, also named for Edward Everett Horton, between bus stops at Aldea and Balboa. The borderline of Anthony C. Beilenson Park is directly across the street from the corner of Burbank Boulevard and Edward Everett Horton Lane. The opposite end of the lane leads to a foot bridge that overlooks the Ventura Freeway and ends on the Amestoy Avenue side.

British radio DJ and comedian Kenny Everett adopted the name of Everett in honor of Horton, who was a childhood hero of his. (His real name was Maurice Cole).

For his contribution to the motion picture industry, Horton has a star on the Hollywood Walk of Fame at 6427 Hollywood Boulevard.

Filmography

Partial television credits

Radio appearances

References

Listen to
Interview with Edward Everett Horton (January 8, 1940)

Further reading

External links

 
 
 
 
 Edward Everett Horton on SilentMajority.com 
 Edward Everett Horton at Virtual History

1886 births
1970 deaths
American male film actors
American male radio actors
American male silent film actors
20th-century American male actors
American male stage actors
American male television actors
American male voice actors
American people of Cuban descent
American people of English descent
American people of German descent
American people of Scottish descent
Baltimore City College alumni
Burials at Forest Lawn Memorial Park (Glendale)
Deaths from cancer in California
Columbia University alumni
Male actors from New York City
People from Brooklyn
Polytechnic Institute of New York University alumni
Vaudeville performers
RKO Pictures contract players
Boys High School (Brooklyn) alumni